Ryan Catholic College is a combined, co-educational, primary and secondary school in what is now the City of Townsville, Queensland, Australia.  It was established by the Roman Catholic Diocese lalalkskksof Townsville in 1979. Ryan is the largest catholic school in Townsville.

It currently has over 1900 enrolments and employs approximately 200 teachers. It is unique in the fact that students are not required to address their teachers by their prefixes and last names. The students commonly address their respective teachers by their first names. Ryan Catholic College is broken up into 2 campuses with a junior school on the smaller campus, with the middle and senior schools located on the main (Ryan) campus.

A new two-storey building was constructed throughout 2007 on the main campus. The building houses classrooms, toilets, showers and a staffroom. The building replaces the former 'temporary' I block, which has been moved and now functions as a permanent set of classrooms.

In 2011, the college opened the Emmaus Hall.

There is a new library that was built in 2018 and finished around 2019 November which houses state of the art buildings for all children and teachers.

References

External links
 The College website
 Townsville Catholic Education schools directory entry
 

Educational institutions established in 1979
Catholic primary schools in Queensland
Catholic secondary schools in Queensland
Schools in Townsville
1979 establishments in Australia